Love Message may refer to:

"Love Message" (song), a 1996 song
Love Message (film), a 2005 Chinese film